Małachów  is a village in the administrative district of Gmina Szczekociny within Zawiercie County, Silesian Voivodeship in southern Poland.

The village has a population of 10 people.

References

Villages in Zawiercie County